Lažany is a small village and municipality in Prešov District in the Prešov Region of eastern Slovakia.

Name
The name comes from Slovak Laz - a kind of small mountain village.

History
In historical records the village was first mentioned in 1320.

Geography
The municipality lies at an altitude of 368 metres and covers an area of 1.313 km². It has a population of about 150 people.

References

Citations

Bibliography

External links
 
 

Villages and municipalities in Prešov District
Šariš